In enzymology, an ADP-specific phosphofructokinase is an enzyme that catalyzes the chemical reaction

ADP + D-fructose 6-phosphate  AMP + D-fructose 1,6-bisphosphate

Thus, the two substrates of this enzyme are ADP and D-fructose 6-phosphate, whereas its two products are AMP and D-fructose 1,6-bisphosphate.

This enzyme belongs to the family of transferases, specifically those transferring phosphorus-containing groups (phosphotransferases) with an alcohol group as acceptor.  The systematic name of this enzyme class is ADP:D-fructose-6-phosphate 1-phosphotransferase. This enzyme is also called ADP-6-phosphofructokinase, ADP-dependent phosphofructokinase.

Structural studies

As of late 2007, only one structure has been solved for this class of enzymes, with the PDB accession code .

References 

 

EC 2.7.1
Enzymes of known structure